Charlotte Alexandra Jones (born 18 March 1977) is a Welsh television presenter, best known for co-presenting the BBC One magazine programme The One Show. She presented Tumble (2014), Close Calls: On Camera (2015–2016) and Shop Well for Less? (2016–2020).

Early life
Jones was born in Ammanford, Carmarthenshire, to Mary and Alun Jones, and has a younger sister, Jennie. After training as a ballet dancer as a child, Jones studied theatre, film and television at the Aberystwyth University, sitting her final exams in Magaluf, Spain, while appearing as a contestant on the first series of Sky1 show Prickly Heat.

Career
Jones became a television researcher after leaving university, but was sacked twice, once for mistaking Mike Peters from the band The Alarm for a workman who had come to fix the office alarm.  She was asked by a producer at Avanti productions to audition in front of the camera at age 21. Her first presenting job was for BBC Choice, and she then joined S4C as a presenter on the singing programme Cân i Gymru (A Song for Wales). Jones developed a speciality presenting Welsh-language children's programmes on S4C, including Hip neu Sgip? and Salon, alongside occasional appearances on mainstream British television, including Channel 4's RI:SE.

Jones presented travel show Tocyn (Ticket) on S4C with Aled Samuel, the extreme sports show Chwa, and was part of the crew on Jonathan Davies's Welsh-language rugby show Jonathan for the 2010 Six Nations Championship. Jones was a regular co-host on Real Radio GMG in Wales.

On 25 July 2010, Jones was announced as the new female co-host on The One Show, replacing Christine Bleakley. Jones replaced Claudia Winkleman as co-presenter of Let's Dance for Comic Relief during the programme's third series in February 2011. She also was part of the BBC team for The Royal Wedding 2011 on 29 April 2011, reporting from Kate Middleton's home town. Jones also presented the United Kingdom's points in the Eurovision Song Contest 2011.

Since 2012, Jones, along with Matt Baker and John Inverdale has co-hosted The Sport Relief Games Show, live coverage of the Sport Relief games that afternoon.

On 19 July 2014, Jones hosted the Live at Edinburgh Castle concert event on BBC One. Beginning on 9 August 2014, Jones presented the BBC One gymnastics competition series Tumble which ran throughout September 2014.

In 2015, Jones began presenting the daytime series Close Calls: On Camera for BBC One and in 2016 she began co-hosting the BBC series Shop Well for Less? alongside Steph McGovern. In September 2016 she fronted a one-off documentary Alex Jones – Fertility and Me for BBC One. She also presented The Secrets in My Family, a primetime documentary series for UKTV's W channel.

Strictly Come Dancing

Jones competed in the ninth series of Strictly Come Dancing in 2011. Her professional partner was James Jordan. Jones and Jordan were eliminated a week before the final, and finished 5th overall in the competition.

Strictly Come Dancing performances

Personal life
On 10 July 2012, Jones became a Fellow of Aberystwyth University.

Jones was appointed as a member of the Gorsedd of the Bards during a ceremony at the National Eisteddfod of Wales in Meifod, Powys, in August 2015; honoured for her contribution to Welsh culture.

In February 2016, Jones was granted a restraining order against a homeless man who sent her vulgar tweets and turned up at her workplace, claiming to be in love with her. He was banned from contacting Jones and her family.

On 2 September 2016, Jones announced via Twitter that she and her husband were expecting their first child; her last appearance on The One Show before her maternity leave was on 6 January 2017. On 26 January 2017, Jones announced via a live telephone call to The One Show that she had given birth to a baby boy. Later that year, Jones suffered a miscarriage.

In December 2018 she announced, live on The One Show, that she was pregnant with her second child. Jones gave birth to a baby boy on 13 May 2019 at Queen Charlotte Hospital.

In March 2021 Jones announced on BBC's The One Show, that she was pregnant with her third child. On 24 August 2021, it was announced that Jones had given birth to a baby girl on 21 August.

Charity
Jones is a patron for the Kidney Wales Foundation.

From 18 to 20 March 2014, Jones participated in the Sport Relief appeal by being dragged up the 1,200 ft Moonlight Buttress in Zion National Park, Utah in the US by climber Andy Kirkpatrick. Jones raised £1,281,476 for the charity appeal. Coverage of the challenge was shown on The One Show and in a 30-minute film which aired on 23 March 2014 on BBC One called Alex Against the Rock for Sport Relief.

From 7–11 March 2016, Jones took part in her second challenge for Sport Relief, called 'Hell on High Seas', in which she, along with five other celebrities: Suzi Perry, Doon Mackichan, Angellica Bell, Hal Cruttenden and Ore Oduba sailed 1,000 miles from Belfast to London. During the Sport Relief telethon, it was announced the team had raised £1,062,868.

Filmography
Television

Guest appearances

Alan Carr: Chatty Man (2010) 
Pointless Celebrities (2011)
Epic Win (2011) 
Loose Women (2011, 2014,2018)
Would I Lie to You? (2012, 2015, 2021) 
12 Again (2012)
Let's Do Lunch with Gino & Mel (2012)
Room 101 (2013)
8 Out of 10 Cats (2013, 2014) 
What's Cooking? (2013) 
The Apprentice: You're Fired! (2013) 
That Puppet Game Show (2013) 
I Love My Country (2013)
The Sarah Millican Television Programme (2013)
The Chase: Celebrity Special (2013)
The Michael McIntyre Chat Show (2014)
W1A (2015)
The Box (2015)
Duck Quacks Don't Echo (2015) 
The TV That Made Me (2016) 
Michael McIntyre's Big Show (2016)
The Hairy Bikers Home for Christmas (2017)
Mary Berry's Christmas Party (2017)
Richard Osman’s House of Games (2020)
Sunday Brunch (2023)

Film

References

External links

BBC One Show profile
Sunday Morning with Alex Jones (BBC Radio Wales)

1977 births
Living people
21st-century Welsh women
Alumni of Aberystwyth University
BBC television presenters
Bards of the Gorsedd
British women television presenters
People from Ammanford
Welsh-language television presenters
Welsh television presenters